Demetrida chaudoiri is a species of ground beetle in the subfamily Lebiinae. It was described by William John Macleay in 1871 and is found in Australia.

References

Beetles described in 1871
Beetles of Australia
chaudoiri